The 2017–18 season was Szombathelyi Haladás's 62nd competitive football season, 10th consecutive season in the OTP Bank Liga and 98th year in existence as a football club.

Players 
As of 7 June 2017.

Players transferred during the season

Summer

In:

Out:

Winter

In:

Out:

Nemzeti Bajnokság I

League table

Matches

Hungarian Cup

Friendly games (2017)

Friendly games (2018)

References

Szombathelyi Haladás seasons
Hungarian football clubs 2017–18 season